Robert Edward Grigg (23 June 1924 – February 2002) was a British aerospace engineer, and was the chief designer of the highly-successful British Aerospace 146 (Hawker Siddeley).

Early life
He was born in Great Yarmouth on the Norfolk coast. He was the son of Robert Grigg and Emily Rudderham.

Career

British Aerospace 146
394 of the BAe 146 were produced, making it the most successful British airliner. Production started in 1983 and ended in 2002. It began as the DH123, then the DH126 which was a scaled-up version of the DH125 which had been built at Hatfield. As Hawker Siddeley it became the HS131. Woodford (former Avro) was designing the HS860 and it was proposed to merge this design team with that of the HS136 in Hertfordshire. A similar concurrent design was the proposed four-engined Armstrong Whitworth AW.681. By 1969 the design had rear engines. On 29 August 1973 the HS146 project at Hatfield (former de Havilland) was approved by Hawker Siddeley, with plans for a first flight by December 1975. On 21 October 1974 the project was deferred. As British Aerospace, the project was restarted on 10 July 1978, with the first flight of G-SSSH taking place on 3 September 1981 piloted by Mike Goodfellow with Peter Sedgwick, another British Aerospace test pilot.

The aircraft type is now supplied by BAE Systems Regional Aircraft. The aircraft is known by airlines for its excellent STOL characteristics. On 27 November 2001, BAE closed its Regional Jets programme. The last delivered was from Woodford on 25 November 2003 when OH-SAP, a BAe RJ-85, was delivered for Blue1; this was also shortly before the last commercial flight of Concorde.

The BAC One-Eleven, a slightly earlier small airliner, sold 244.

Other projects

He also worked on the Comet, the Trident and the Airbus wing.

Personal life
He married Patricia Williams in 1947. They had two sons in 1950 and 1957. He died in Luton in 2002, having lived previously in Harpenden in Hertfordshire.

See also
 List of BAe 146 operators

References

 Hawker Siddeley Aviation and Dynamics: 1960-77

External links
 BAE Systems Regional Aircraft BAe 146
 Design of the BAe 146

1924 births
2002 deaths
Aircraft designers
British aerospace engineers
Hawker Siddeley
People from Great Yarmouth
People from Harpenden